Michael High School is located in Kurla, a suburb of Mumbai, India. It prepares students for the Secondary School Leaving Certificate examinations conducted by the Maharashtra State Board of Secondary and Higher Secondary Education.

Location 
Michael high school  is situated on Pipe line  Road, off Lal Bahadur Shastri Marg, opposite state Bank of India in Kurla (West), 2.5 km from Kurla railway station and 2.0 km from Vidyavihar railway station (west). This school is very close to the popular Phoenix Market City Mumbai.

Awards and achievements
On 10th Annual Awards ceremony the Principal Mrs Jean Moses Gomes was awarded with the title 'Educationist of the year by the Mobai gaothan panchayat (MGP). In 2015 the school has been awarded as 'Best school of the year' by Tata Power for club enerji programme

References

Christian schools in Maharashtra
High schools and secondary schools in Mumbai
Educational institutions established in 1988
1988 establishments in Maharashtra